Violet Barbour (July 5, 1884 Cincinnati, Ohio - August 31, 1968) was an American historian.

Education
She graduated from Cornell University with a B.A., M.A., and Ph.D.

Career
Beginning in 1914, she taught at Vassar College as a professor of English and European history.

Awards
 1925 Guggenheim Fellowship
 1913 Herbert Baxter Prize by the American Historical Association

Selected works
Privateers and pirates of the West Indies, Cornell University, 1909
Capitalism in Amsterdam in the Seventeenth Century, University of Michigan Press, 1950
 Henry Bennet, Earl of Arlington, Secretary of State to Charles II, American Historical Association, 1915

References

1884 births
1968 deaths
Cornell University alumni
Vassar College faculty
20th-century American historians
American women historians
20th-century American women writers
Historians of the early modern period
Place of death missing